Winds of Change is the seventh studio album by singer-songwriter Russ Taff, released in 1995 on Reprise/Warner Bros. Nashville. It is Taff's first, and only, full-length mainstream country album. The title song and "I Cry" are the only two songs from his 1989 album The Way Home that he re-recorded for this album. The first country single "Love Is Not a Thing" debuted on Billboards Hot Country Songs chart on January 14, 1995, at number 64, peaking at number 53 on February 25, 1995, spending a total of 9 weeks. "One and Only Love" and "Bein' Happy" were also released as singles and music videos performing moderately well on country radio and CMT. Well-known country songwriter/producer/musician Randy Scruggs produced the album's first six tracks, while Taff and his long-time guitarist James Hollihan, Jr. produced the remaining four tracks.

Track listing
 Tracks 1 - 6 produced by Randy Scruggs
 Tracks 7 - 10 produced by Russ Taff and James Hollihan, Jr.

 Personnel 
 Russ Taff – lead vocals, backing vocals, acoustic guitar 
 Larry Hall – acoustic piano
 James Hollihan Jr. – acoustic piano, keyboards, organ, acoustic guitar, electric guitar, slide guitar, bass, percussion, string arrangements 
 John Barlow Jarvis – acoustic piano 
 Steve Nathan – keyboards, organ 
 Matt Rollings – acoustic piano 
 Billy Joe Walker Jr. – acoustic guitar 
 Chris Leuzinger – electric guitar 
 Randy Scruggs – electric guitar 
 Jerry Douglas – dobro
 Terry Crisp – steel guitar
 Paul Franklin – steel guitar 
 Al Perkins – steel guitar 
 Mike Brignardello – bass 
 Jackie Street – bass 
 Willie Weeks – bass
 John Hammond – drums 
 Paul Leim – drums 
 Tom Roady – percussion 
 Rob Hajacos – fiddle
 John Darnall – string conductor 
 Carl Gorodetzky – string contractor 
 Nashville String Machine – strings 
 Michael Black – backing vocals 
 Cynthia Clawson – backing vocals 
 Michael English – backing vocals
 Bonnie Keen – backing vocals 
 Mac McAnally – backing vocals
 Jonell Mosser – backing vocals 
 John Wesley Ryles – backing vocals
 Dennis Wilson – backing vocals 
 Curtis Young – backing vocals Production'''
 Doug Grau – executive producer, A&R 
 Lynn Fuston – recording
 James Hollihan Jr. – recording 
 Russ Long – recording 
 Ron "Snake" Reynolds – recording 
 Paul "Salvo" Salveson – recording 
 Steve Tillisch – recording, mixing 
 Brian Hardin – second engineer 
 Benny Quinn – digital editing and mastering at Masterfonics (Nashville, Tennessee)
 Laura LiPuma-Nash – art direction, design 
 Peter Nash – photography 
 Zack Glickman – management 
 Walt Quinn – management

Critical reception
Tim Griggs of AllMusic said "With the aid of Nashville's elite studio musicians, Russ Taff makes a joyful noise on 'Bein' Happy,' the album opener on Winds of Change.'' Taff and gang then tackle topics such a marriage, love, and heartache with mixed results."

Singles

References

1995 albums
Country albums by American artists
Russ Taff albums
Reprise Records albums
Warner Records albums